Immaculate Ndabaneze was a Minister in Burundi. She served as the Minister of Commerce, Transport, Industry and Tourism.

Background and career 
Ndabaneze is a native of Gihanga Commune in Bubanza Province. She is a trained Economist and she utilised her profession for 20 years in the Banking Industry. She became a Politician in 1999 and she was the Chairman of the Standing Committee in charge of Economic Issues, Finance and Budget. She is the Head of the Board of Directors of Tujane Microfinance Bank in Burundi.

References 

1972 births
Women government ministers of Burundi
Living people
People from Bubanza Province